Anton Sergeyevich Alekseyev (Anton Serhiyovych Alekseyev, ; born 31 March 1984) is a retired Ukraine-born Russian professional football player.

Club career
He played for the main squad of FC Spartak Moscow in the Russian Premier League Cup.

External links

1984 births
Footballers from Kharkiv
Ukrainian emigrants to Russia
Living people
Russian footballers
Association football goalkeepers
FC Arsenal Kharkiv players
FC Spartak Moscow players
FC Okean Nakhodka players
FC SKA-Khabarovsk players
FC Olimpia Volgograd players
FC Krasnodar players
FC Politehnica Iași (2010) players
Liga II players
Russian expatriate footballers
Expatriate footballers in Romania
FC Mashuk-KMV Pyatigorsk players